Malloy v. Hogan, 378 U.S. 1 (1964), was a case in which the Supreme Court of the United States deemed defendants' Fifth Amendment privilege not to be compelled to be witnesses against themselves was applicable within state courts as well as federal courts, overruling the decision in Twining v. New Jersey (1908). The majority decision holds that the Fourteenth Amendment allows the federal government to enforce the first eight amendments on state governments.

The test for voluntariness used in the Malloy decision was later abrogated by Arizona v. Fulminante (1991).

Background
Malloy, a petitioner, was sentenced to a year in jail for unlawful gambling. After three months, he was released from jail and put on probation for two years and was asked to testify to a state inquiry into gambling and other criminal activities in which Malloy was involved.

He refused to answer the questions to avoid incriminating himself. The court put him back in jail until he testified.

Question
Is a state witness's Fifth Amendment guarantee against self-incrimination protected by the Fourteenth Amendment?

Decision
In a 5–4 decision, Justice Brennan wrote the majority of the court in support of Malloy. The court noted that "the American judicial system is accusatorial, not inquisitorial" and the Fourteenth Amendment protects a witness against self-incrimination. Therefore, both state and federal officials must "establish guilt by evidence that is free and independent of a suspect's or witnesses' statements."

See also
List of United States Supreme Court cases, volume 378

References

Further reading

External links
 

United States Supreme Court cases
United States Supreme Court cases of the Warren Court
United States Supreme Court decisions that overrule a prior Supreme Court decision
United States Fifth Amendment self-incrimination case law
Incorporation case law
1964 in United States case law
Gambling in the United States